Maryport Lighthouse is a small lighthouse located in Maryport, Cumbria, England, formerly run by England's general lighthouse authority, Trinity House. It is a Grade II listed building.

18th century
Maryport is said to have possessed a small lighthouse in 1796; five years later Robert Stevenson described it in a report as an oil lamp with two reflectors.

19th century
In 1833 an Act of Parliament granted permission for a dock to be built at Maryport together with a new pier and lighthouse. Construction was overseen by a new board of trustees
and the pier, complete with its lighthouse, was in place by 1846. Both remain in situ and the light is said to be 
the UK's oldest cast iron lighthouse (though it no longer serves as a navigation light). It was originally gas-lit.

Subsequently, the harbour continued to expand. The previous year, following completion of the Elizabeth Dock, additional (minor) lights had been installed on the north tongue and south jetty, within the harbour, coloured green and red respectively.

20th century
By 1946 the light was powered by acetylene. The painter L. S. Lowry used Maryport and the lighthouse in several of his paintings. Trinity House took charge of it in 1961.

In 1996 Trinity House provided a new aluminium tower for the end of the pier extension, lit by mains electricity. At 4.7 metres tall and with a light intensity of only 120 candelas, the new tower was one of Trinity House's smaller beacons; it displays a flashing white light visible  out to sea.

21st century
In 2010 Trinity House transferred responsibility for the new light to the Maryport Harbour Authority. The old lighthouse was restored and repainted in 2017 as part of a government-funded initiative for the refurbishment of seaside towns. Maryport Lighthouse was recognised during the 370th Council Meeting of the Round Table of Britain and Ireland

See also

 List of lighthouses in England

References

External links
 Picture of the active Maryport Lighthouse

Lighthouses in Cumbria
Lighthouses completed in 1796
Lighthouses completed in 1996
18th-century architecture in the United Kingdom
19th-century architecture in the United Kingdom
Grade II listed lighthouses
Grade II listed buildings in Cumbria
1796 establishments in England
Maryport